Pleiogynium timoriense, commonly known as the Burdekin plum, sweet plum, tulip plum, or in the Djabugay language guybalum is a medium-sized fruit-bearing tree in the family Anacardiaceae native to Malesia, Australia and the Pacific Islands.

Description

It has a dense canopy with glossy dark green leaves 4-10 x 2–6 cm and the trunk has a rough bark. Leaves are imparipinnate with 5 to 11 leaflets which are arranged opposite and are elliptic to ovate in shape. The stalk of the terminal leaflet is significantly longer than those of the lateral leaflets. There are prominent domatia on the underside of leaflets.

The tree is dioecious (that is, with separate male and female plants) and has yellowish-green  flowers which appear between January and March. The flower calyx lobes are about 0.6–1 mm long, with ovate petals about 1.7-3.8 mm long. Filaments are about 1.3-2.3 mm long.

The fruit is a depressed-obovoid drupe, about 20-25 x 20–38 mm. The fruit's flesh is generally plum-coloured (dark purple), however, white varieties have been reported. The fruit is edible when ripe.

Taxonomy

The basionym of this species is Icica timoriensis, and was originally described in Prodromus Systematis Naturalis Regni Vegetabilis by Augustin Pyramus de Candolle in 1825. It was renamed Pleiogynium timoriense in 1952 by Pieter Willem Leenhouts in the journal Blumea. A number of other botanists, notably Daniel Solander, Ferdinand von Mueller and George Bentham, have also described specimens of this species under different names, all of which are now heterotypic synonyms of Pleiogynium timoriense

Etymology

The genus name Pleiogynium derives from the Ancient Greek pleíōn meaning "more", and gunḗ meaning "female". It refers to the numerous carpels in the flowers. The species epithet means "from Timor", where the first specimen was collected.

Distribution
The natural range of P. timoriense includes  Borneo, Sulawesi, the Philippines, the Moluccas, New Guinea, the Soloman Islands, the Cook Islands, Tonga, Fiji, New Caledonia, and Queensland. In Queensland, the species occurs in dry rainforest, littoral and subcoastal riverine rainforest north from around Gympie.

Ecology

The fruits are eaten by cassowaries and great bowerbirds.

Uses

The fruit is edible but tart, although the pale greenish varieties have been found to be more palatable. Indigenous Australians are known to have buried the fruit underground to ripen. Fruit can be cooked, eaten raw or used in jellies, jams and preserves.

Joseph Banks, on his voyage to Australia with Captain James Cook, collected some of the fruits when they stopped in the Endeavour River, and he made the note: "These when gathered off from the tree were very hard and disagreeable but after being kept for a few days became soft and tasted much like indifferent Damsons".

The timber is decorative but seldom used due to the lack of supply of good logs.

Gallery

References

Further reading

External links

 

Anacardiaceae
Sapindales of Australia
Trees of Australia
Flora of Queensland
Bushfood